Luis Alberto Rivera Morales (born 21 June 1987, in Agua Prieta) is a Mexican long jumper. His personal best is 8.46 metres, achieved in July 2013.

He attended Central Arizona College, where he learned English. After finishing his General Studies degree, he attended the University of Arizona, where he was named all-American in long jump.  He finished his Bachelor in Science in Industrial Engineering.

Currently, he is studying his PhD in Systems and Industrial Engineering.

In 2013, Luis Rivera competed at the World University Games held in Kazan, Russia, where he jumped 8.46 meters to take the gold medal in a head-to-head battle with Russian national favorite Aleksandr Menkov, who finished 4 cm behind. Rivera's winning jump became the Mexican national record, and the University Games record.

Just over a month later, at the World Championships in Moscow, Russia, Menkov was again in the competition. This time Menkov took the gold with the Russian National record of 8.56 m while Rivera took the bronze medal with a jump of 8.27 m.

His brother, Edgar Rivera, competes in the high jump. He has participated in various international competitions, including the World Universiade in Shenzhen, China, and in Kazan, Russia. He also participated in two world championships, in Daegu, Korea 2011 and Moscow, Russia 2013.

Competition record

References

External links
 

1987 births
Living people
Mexican male long jumpers
Olympic athletes of Mexico
Sportspeople from Sonora
Athletes (track and field) at the 2012 Summer Olympics
People from Agua Prieta
Athletes (track and field) at the 2015 Pan American Games
Central Arizona College alumni
Arizona Wildcats men's track and field athletes
Universiade medalists in athletics (track and field)
Universiade gold medalists for Mexico
Competitors at the 2011 Summer Universiade
Medalists at the 2013 Summer Universiade
Pan American Games competitors for Mexico
21st-century Mexican people
20th-century Mexican people